Candelas blå is the debut studio album by Swedish dansband Candela.

Track listing
Du finns i mina tankar (I. Ebbesson)
På solokvist (D. Stråhed)
Nätterna med dig (J. Thunqvist - K. Svenling)
Viva! Fernando Garcia (B. Månsson - K. Svenling)
Det är så lätt att leva livet (T. Hatch - Sven-Olle)
Du har fått mig att falla (Only a Fool) (Gebauer - Reilly -Hodgson - Lindfors)
En väg till ditt hjärta (P. Bergqvist - H. Backström)
Av hela mitt hjärta (B. Månsson - C. Lösnitz)
Vikingarnas land (D. Stråhed)
En sång om kärleken (J. Öhlund - Å. Lindfors)
Väntar på dig (B. Heil)
Hanky Panky (Madonna L Ciccione - Patrick Leanard)
När du ser på mig (B. Heil)
Blott du och jag (Dej og mej) (G. Keller - K. Heik- P. Hermansson)

References 

1994 debut albums
Candela (Swedish band) albums